Olive A. Greeley (June 10, 1901 – May 21, 1982) was an assistant field director and bolometer assistant for the Smithsonian Astrophysical Observatory.

Greeley was born on June 10, 1901 as Olive Adelia Troup in Maxwell, Iowa. Her father was Martin H. Troup and her mother was Rose Adelia Randall. Olive's mother died in 1908. Her father remarried in 1947 to Inez Martin Troup, who became her stepmother.

On June 10, 1937, she married Frederick Atwood Greeley in Riverside, California after meeting at the Smithsonian Astrophysical Observatory Solar Observing Station at Table Mountain. In 1942, she traveled to Lima, Peru with her husband. From 1943-1946, she served as bolometer assistant to Frederick Atwood Greeley at the Smithsonian Astrophysical Observatory station at Mount Montezuma, Chile. She also served as the assistant station director for the Smithsonian Astrophysical Observatory Miami Solar Station in Miami, Florida from May 1, 1947 to July 31, 1948. During her position at the Table Mountain Station, Mount Montezuma Station, and the Miami Solar Station, she documented the day-to-day activities of the stations.

Olive A. Greeley died on May 21,1982 in Laguna Hills, California.

References 

Smithsonian Institution people
1901 births
1982 deaths
People from Story County, Iowa
Scientists from Iowa
20th-century American scientists
20th-century American women scientists